is a train station located in Kashihara, Nara Prefecture, Japan. It is on Kintetsu Kashihara Line, Minami Osaka Line and Yoshino Lines. It is one of the major stations on the Kintetsu lines and all trains in service stop at this station.

The center station building was designed by Togo Murano, an architect representing the 20th century.

Lines 
 Kintetsu Railway
 Kashihara Line
 Minami Osaka Line
 Yoshino Line

Platforms and tracks 
This station has two island platforms serving 4 narrow gauge tracks for the Minami Osaka Line and the Yoshino Line in the west, and two island platforms serving 3 standard gauge tracks for the Kashihara Line and a narrow gauge track for the Yoshino Line in the east.

Ridership
The number of passengers who get on and off trains at this station is 19,960 persons per day, according to the research by Kintetsu Corporation on November 9, 2010.

Connections
Buses are operated by Nara Kotsu Bus Lines.

As of October 2014
West stop (Kashiharajingu-eki nishiguchi)
Route 25 for Minami-Shirakashi
Route 26 and 28 for Minami-Shirakashi via Minami-Myohojicho
Route 28 for Yagi Station via Kashihara Gymnasium Unebigoryo-mae, Idai-byoin-mae (Nara Medical University Hospital), and Kashihara City Hall
Route 53 for Yagi Station via Ousa, Idai-byoin Genkanguchi (Nara Medical University Hospital), and Kashihara City Hall
Route 53 for Kintetsu Gose Station via Gunkaibashi and Daikancho
Center stop (Kashiharajingu-eki)
Route 28 for Yagi Station via Unebigoryo-mae, Idai-byoin-mae (Nara Medical University Hospital), and Kashihara City Hall
Route 28 for Minami-Shirakashi via Kashiharajingu-eki-nishiguchi and Minami-Myohojicho
East stop 1 (Kashiharajingu-eki higashiguchi)
Route 8 for Yagi Station via Ousa and Idai-byoin-mae (Nara Medical University Hospital)
Routes 51, 52 and 53 for Yagi Station via Ousa and Idai-byoin Genkanguchi (Nara Medical University Hospital)
Route 51 for Oyodo Bus Center via Kamihigaimoto
Route 53 for Kintetsu Gose Station via Kashiharajingu-eki nishiguchi, Gunkaibashi, and Daikancho
Town Office
East stop 2 (Kashiharajingu-eki higashiguchi)
Route 2 for Okadera-mae for Toyoura and Asuka Daibutsu-mae (mornings)
Route 5 for Okadera-mae via Shobucho Yonchome-minami
Route 7 for Shobusho Yonchome-minani via Shobucho Itchome, Shobucho Sanchome and Shobucho Yonchome
Route 8 and 9 for Shobusho Yonchome via Shobucho Itchome and Shobucho Sanchome
Route 11 for Shuhodai via Okadera Station
Route 12 for Shuhodai via Shobucho Yonchome
Route 15 "Aka-Kame" for Hinokuma via Asuka Station
Route 16 "Aka-Kame" for Asuka Station via Asuka Historical Museum, Man'yo Bunkakan (Complex of Man'yo Culture) and Ishibutai
Route 17 "Aka-Kame" for Okahashimoto via Asuka Historical Museum, Man'yo Bunkakan (Complex of Man'yo Culture) and Ishibutai
Route 18 for Kashiharajingu-eki higashiguchi via Shobucho Yonchome-minami, Okadera-mae, Asuka Daibutsu-mae and Toyoura (evenings)
Route 19 for Kashiharajingu-eki higashiguchi via Toyoura, Asuka Daibutsu-mae, Okadera-mae and Shobucho Yonchome-minami (mornings)
Route 23 "Aka-Kame" for Asuka Station via Asuka-Koyama, Asuka Historical Museum, Man'yo Bunkakan (Complex of Man'yo Culture) and Ishibutai
Route 文 for Kenko Fukushi Center for Toyoura and Asuka Daibutsu-mae and Okadera-mae (operated on school days)

Stores in Kashiharajingu-mae Station
Wakakusa shoten (Book shop)
Matsumoto-Kiyoshi (Drug store)
Kiharu (Japanese food restaurant)
FamilyMart (Convenience store)
Doutor Coffee
Small convenience store on Platforms Nos. 6 and 7
ATM (Bank of Nanto)

Around Kashiharajingu-mae Station
Kashihara Royal Hotel (East Exit)
Kashihara Kanko Hotel (Center Exit)
Kashihara Park (Center Exit)
Athletic Stadium
Baseball Stadium
Mister Donut (West Exit)
Daily Yamazaki (West Exit)
Kashihara Shrine (Center Exit)

References

External links
 

Railway stations in Japan opened in 1923
Railway stations in Nara Prefecture